The GCC Champions League, is an annually organized football league tournament for club of the Arabian Peninsula.

The 2017 will be after 2016 edition was postponed, therefore this will be the 31st edition to be played.  the tournament was never played due to continuation of Kuwait Football Association ban by FIFA.

Teams

Note:
Clubs subject to change from representative associations.

External links
Official website
Season at soccerway.com

References

2017
2017 in Asian football
Cancelled association football competitions